Peter P. Chen Award is an annually presented award to honor one individual for their contributions to the field of conceptual modeling. Named after the computer scientist Peter Chen, the award was started in 2008 by the publisher Elsevier as a means of celebrating the 25th anniversary of the journal Data & Knowledge Engineering. It is presented at the Entity Relationship (ER) International Conference on Conceptual Modeling. Winners are given a plaque, a cash prize, and are invited to give a keynote speech.

There are five criteria for selecting the winner; research, how the nominee has contributed to advance the field of conceptual modeling; service, organizational contributions for related meetings, conferences, and editorial boards; education, mentoring of doctoral students in the field; contribution to practice, contributions to technology transfer, commercialization, and industrial projects; and international reputation. The selection committee is composed of the Steering Committee chair, two Program Committee members that have been appointed by the Steering Committee chair, and recipients of the last two years.

Laureates

References

Awards established in 2008
Science and technology awards